is a railway station in Hyogo-ku, Kobe, Japan, operated by West Japan Railway Company (JR West) and Kobe Municipal Subway.

Station layout
The JR West station is composed of a single track with one side platform. It is unmanned and has unrestricted access to the platform. However, the Wadamisaki Line is only operational during mornings and evenings. Fare collection for this station is conducted at Hyogo, the only other stop on the line.

Platforms
The subway station has an island platform serving two tracks.

JR West

Adjacent stations

History
The subway station opened on 7 July 2001, coinciding with the opening of the Kaigan Line.

Surrounding area
The station is located in the city's industrial area, and is mainly used by commuters to the Mitsubishi Heavy Industries and Mitsubishi Electric plants. Kobe Wing Stadium, home of Vissel Kobe football club, is located nearby, so the station is also used by fans on match days.

References

External links
JR West - Wadamisaki Station 

Stations of Kobe Municipal Subway
Railway stations in Hyōgo Prefecture
Sanyō Main Line
Railway stations in Japan opened in 1890